Tiaan William Raymond Cloete (born 12 November 1989) is a former South African cricketer. A left-handed batsman and left-arm orthodox spin bowler, he played first-class, List A, and twenty20 cricket for Boland, debuting in the 2009/10 season and making his last appearance in December 2014 at the age of 25.

References
Tiaan Cloete profile at CricketArchive

1989 births
Living people
Cricketers from Paarl
South African cricketers
Boland cricketers